An Election to the Edinburgh Corporation was held on 3 May 1966, alongside municipal elections across Scotland. Of the councils 69 seats, 23 were up for election.

After the election Edinburgh Corporation wa composed of 36 Progressives, 33 Labour councillors, and 1 Liberal. The Progressives increased their majority to three seats.

Aggregate results

Ward Results

References

1966
1966 Scottish local elections